Kelvin Kwarteng Yeboah (born 6 May 2000) is a professional footballer who plays as a forward for Bundesliga side FC Augsburg, on loan from Genoa. Born in Ghana, he is a youth international for Italy.

He is the nephew of former Ghanaian international footballer Tony Yeboah.

Club career
Yeboah joined the academy of Premier League side West Ham United before joining Italian Serie C side Gozzano academy. In November 2017, Yeboah held a trial with Danish Superliga side Aalborg BK training with their first team. Yeboah saw the rest of the 2017–18 season out with Combined Counties League Division One club AC London, scoring six league goals in 19 appearances.

On 19 June 2018, Yeboah signed for Austrian Bundesliga side WSG Tirol. He made his debut for the club in August 2019 against Austria Klagenfurt. He helped his club earn promotion to the Austrian Football Bundesliga after winning the Austrian Second Division for the 2018–19 season. After earning promotion, on 4 July 2019 Yeboah signed a new longer-term contract at WSG.

He made his first appearance in Bundesliga on 31 August 2019, playing in a 1–5 defeat against FC Salzburg, which included a goal from FC Salzburg striker Erling Haaland, whose father Alfie Haaland had briefly been a teammate of Kelvin's uncle Tony at Leeds United in 1997.

On 25 September 2019, Yeboah came to prominence on a big stage, by scoring four goals in a single match for WSG Tirol in the 5–2 Austrian Cup victory against Austria Wien.

On 6 February 2021, Yeboah transferred to fellow Austrian Bundesliga side Sturm Graz, signing a contract until the summer of 2024.

On 8 January 2022, he signed with Genoa. After suffering relegation with the Grifone and playing the first half of the season at the 2022–23 Serie B level, on 18 January 2023 Yeboah was loaned out to Bundesliga side FC Augsburg, with an option to buy.

International career
Born in Accra, Yeboah grew up in Italy and is eligible to represent both countries at the international level though he is yet to be capped.

On 20 January 2019, Yeboah was called up to the Ghana's under-20s. On 13 August 2021, he was called up to the Ghana senior team ahead of 2022 FIFA World Cup qualifiers against Ethiopia and South Africa. On 27 August, he was called up by Italy's under-21 side. However he rejected the Ghanaian call-up and honoured the Italian under-21 call-up. On 3 September 2021, he made his debut with the Italy U21 squad, playing as a substitute in the qualifying match won 3–0 against Luxembourg.

Career statistics

Club

Notes

Honours
WSG Swarovski Tirol
 Austrian Second Division: 2018–19

References

External links 

 
 

2000 births
Living people
Footballers from Accra
Italian footballers
Italy under-21 international footballers
Ghanaian footballers
Ghanaian emigrants to Italy
Naturalised citizens of Italy
Italian sportspeople of African descent
Association football forwards
Austrian Football Bundesliga players
Bundesliga players
Combined Counties Football League players
2. Liga (Austria) players
Serie A players
Serie B players
WSG Tirol players
SK Sturm Graz players
Genoa C.F.C. players
FC Augsburg players
Italian expatriate footballers
Ghanaian expatriate footballers
Expatriate footballers in England
Italian expatriate sportspeople in England
Ghanaian expatriate sportspeople in England
Italian expatriate sportspeople in Austria
Ghanaian expatriate sportspeople in Austria
Italian expatriate sportspeople in Germany
Ghanaian expatriate sportspeople in Germany
Expatriate footballers in Austria